The Thomas I. Stoner House in Des Moines, Iowa, also known as The Highlands, was designed by Wetherell & Harrison and was built in 1931.  It includes elements of Spanish Eclectic and Late 19th and 20th Century Revivals architecture.  It overlooks the Waveland Golf Course and it has a ceramic tile roof.

It was listed on the National Register of Historic Places in 1992.  It was deemed significant for its architecture, as "an excellent, virtually unaltered example of the Spanish eclectic style."

References

Houses on the National Register of Historic Places in Iowa
Houses completed in 1931
Houses in Des Moines, Iowa
National Register of Historic Places in Des Moines, Iowa